The Gao Empire preceded the Songhai Empire in the region of the Middle Niger. It owes its name to the town of Gao located at the eastern Niger bend. In the ninth century CE, it was considered to be the most powerful West African kingdom.

Gao was founded in the 7th century. Because of its placement along the Niger River, it was a profitable location for fisherman to settle. Gao is one of the oldest trading centers in western Africa. Because of the placement of Gao, Gao became the capital for the Songhai (or Songhay) Empire in the early 11th century. Gao was able to flourish as the capital of the Songhai Empire, most notably via the trans-Saharan trade of gold, copper, slaves, and salt. Gao was annexed by the rulers of the kingdom of Mali in 1325, but Songhai would eventually retain control of it 40 years later.

There are no surviving indigenous written records that date from before the middle of the 17th century. Our knowledge of the early history of the town relies on the writings of external Arabic geographers living in Morocco, Egypt and Andalusia, who never visited the region.

Rise of the Gao Empire 

Gao was founded in the 7th century on the Niger River, instantly becoming a hub for fishermen and trade, Gao grew between the eighth and tenth centuries and became a kingdom of lesser power than the Wagadu. Gao prospered because of the commercial importance that it had along the Niger. Gao was also a major manufacturing center. Craftspeople fashioned carnelian into beads, which are dated as early as the third century, and which were greatly valued in the Sudan and West African rainforest.

Sources on Gao history
Apart from some Arabic epitaphs on tombstones discovered in 1939 at the cemetery of Gao-Saney (6 km to the east of the city) there are no surviving indigenous written records that date from before the middle of the 17th century. 
Our knowledge of the early history of the town relies on the writings of external Arabic geographers living in Morocco, Egypt and Andalusia, who never visited the region. These authors referred to the town as Kawkaw or Kuku. The two key 17th century chronicles, the Tarikh al-Sudan and the Tarikh al-Fattash, provide information on the town at the time of the Songhai Empire but they contain only vague indications on the time before. The chronicles do not, in general, acknowledge their sources. Their accounts for the earlier periods are almost certainly based on oral tradition and for events before the second half of the 15th century they are likely to be less reliable. For these earlier periods the two chronicles sometimes provide conflicting information.

Pre-Islamic history
The earliest mention of Gao is by al-Khwārizmī who wrote in the first half of the 9th century. In the 9th century Gao was already an important regional power. Al-Yaqubi wrote in his Tarikh in around 872: 
There is the kingdom of the Kawkaw, which is the greatest of the realms of the Sūdān, the most important and most powerful. All the kingdoms obey its king. Al-Kawkaw is the name of the town. Besides this there are a number of kingdoms of which the rulers pay allegiance to him and acknowledge his sovereignty, although they are kings in their own lands.

Ibn al-Faqih (writing c. 903) mentions a caravan route from Egypt to ancient Ghana via Kawkaw. but Ibn Hawqal (writing c. 988) states that the old route from Egypt to the Sudan was abandoned in the reign of the Egyptian ruler Ibn Tulun (ruled 868-884) as some of the caravans were attacked by bandits while others were overwhelmed by the wind-blown sand. The more direct route was replaced by one that went to Sijilmasa before heading south across the Sahara.

Early Islamic history
In the 10th century Gao was already Muslim and was described as consisting of two separate towns. Al-Muhallabi, who died in 990, wrote in a lost work quoted in the biographical dictionary compiled by Yaqut:  
Their king pretends before his subject to be a Muslim and most of them pretend to be Muslims too. He has a town on the Nile [Niger], on the eastern bank, which is called Sarnāh, where there are markets and trading houses and to which there is continuous traffic from all parts. He has another town to the west of the Nile [Niger] where he and his men and those who have his confidence live. There is a mosque there where he prays but the communal prayer ground is between the two towns.

The Gao Empire and the Almoravids

Towns
The archaeological evidence suggests that there were two settlements on the eastern bank of the Niger: Gao Ancien situated within the modern town, to the east of the Tomb of Askia, and the archaeological site of Gao-Saney (Sané in French) situated around 4 km to the east. The bed of the Wadi Gangaber passes to the south of the Gao-Saney occupation mound (tell) but to the north of Gao Ancien. The imported pottery and glass recovered from Gao-Saney suggest that the site was occupied between the 8th and 12th centuries. It is possible that Gao-Saney corresponds to Sarnāh of al-Muhallabi. Al-Bakri writing in 1068 also records the existence of two towns, but al-Idrisi writing in around 1154 does not. Both al-Muhallabi (see quote above) and al-Bakri situate Gao on the west (or right bank) of the Niger. The 17th century Tarikh al-Fattash also states that in the 10th century Gao was situated on the Gourma side (i.e. the west bank) of the river. A large sand dune, La Dune Rose, lies on the west bank opposite Gao, but at Koima, on the edge of the dune at a site 4 km north of Gao, surface deposits indicate a pre 9th century settlement. This could be the west bank Gao mentioned by 10th and 11th century authors. The site has not been excavated.

Al-Sadi in his Tarikh al-Sudan gives a slightly later date for the introduction of Islam. He lists 32 rulers of the Zuwa dynasty and states that in 1009-1010 A.D. the 15th ruler, Zuwa Kusoy, was the first to convert to Islam. He does not actually specify where they lived except for the legendary founder of the dynasty, Zuwa Alayman who he claims came from the Yemen to Kukiya.

Kings of Gao-Saney and the Almoravids
The discovery of the tombstones of Gao-Saney in 1939 has provided the historians of the Gao Empire with new evidence. The three great Muslim rulers belonging to the Zaghe dynasty who died successively in 1100, 1110 and 1120 can be identified with the kings of the Zuwa dynasty. The Islamization of the dynasty took therefore not place at the beginning but at the end of the eleventh century in the time of the Almoravids. The role of the Almoravids in this process has been hotly debated. Earlier the kings of Gao-Saney were considered offshoots of the Almoravids (John Hunwick, 1980), but it has recently been argued that they were converted rulers of a great African dynasty, possibly originating from ancient Ghana (Dierk Lange, 2004).

Language 
The people of the Gao Empire spoke Songay, a language belonging of the Saharo-Sahelian branch of the Nile-Saharan Family. The language was originally brought into the region along the great Bend of the Niger as early as the sixth millennium BCE.

Decline
Towards the end of the 13th century Gao lost its independence and became part of the expanding Mali Empire. What happened to the Zuwa rulers is not recorded. Ibn Battuta visited Gao in 1353 when the town formed part of the Mali Empire. He arrived by boat from Timbuktu on his return journey from visiting the capital of the Empire:Then I travelled to the town of Kawkaw, which is a great town on the Nīl [Niger], one of the finest, biggest, and most fertile cities of the Sūdān. There is much rice there, and milk, and chickens, and fish, and the cucumber, which has no like. Its people conduct their buying and selling with cowries, like the people of Mālī.

After staying a month in the town, Ibn Battuta left with a caravan for Takedda and from there headed north back across the Sahara to an oasis in Tuat with a large caravan that included 600 slave girls.

Sometime in the 14th century, Ali Kulun, the first ruler of the Sunni dynasty, rebelled against Mali hegemony, and was defeated.; It was not until the first half of the 15th century that Sunni Sulayman Dama was able to throw off the Mali yoke. His successor, Sunni Ali Ber (1464–1492), greatly expanded the territory under Songhay control and established the Songhay Empire.

The tomb for the Songhai Emperor Askia Mohamed was built in Gao in 1495. The tomb demonstrates how well Gao did under Songhai rule as well as demonstrating the style of their mud-building.

Bibliography 

. Also available from Aluka but requires subscription.

 (for the three kings see pp. 3, 7-8, 15).

Notes 



Countries in medieval Africa
Former countries in Africa
Political history of Mali
8th-century establishments in Africa
13th-century disestablishments in Africa